Gun laws in New Hampshire regulate the sale, possession, and use of firearms and ammunition in the state of New Hampshire in the United States. New Hampshire's gun laws are amongst some of the most permissive in the United States; while the state has not had a mass shooting event since 1982, its per capita gun death rate, the 9th lowest gun death rate of the 50 states, is double neighboring Massachusetts, which has among the strictest gun laws in the U.S. This is driven entirely by a difference in suicide rates between New Hampshire and Massachusetts, since New Hampshire also has the lowest per capita murder rate of any state, which is less than half the per capita murder rate in Massachusetts.

Summary table

State constitutional provisions
Article 2-a of the Constitution of New Hampshire states: "All persons have the right to keep and bear arms in defense of themselves, their families, their property and the state."

Concealed and open carry
Since February 22, 2017, New Hampshire has been a constitutional carry state, requiring no license to open carry or concealed carry a firearm in public. Concealed carry permits are still issued for purposes of reciprocity with other states.

The New Hampshire license is issued for carry of a "pistol or revolver", and is not a license to carry "weapons" as exists in some other states. The New Hampshire license is issued by the local mayor, selectmen, or police department at a cost of $10 for residents, and by the New Hampshire State Police at a cost of $100 for non-residents (changed from $20 on July 1, 2009). The term of issue of the license is five years. Turn around time is generally one to two weeks, with fourteen days being the maximum time allowed by law. 

New Hampshire has no laws restricting the age at which a person may possess and carry firearms.

On June 2, 2016, the New Hampshire Supreme Court, in Bach v. New Hampshire Dept. of Safety, No. 2014–0721, 2016 WL 3086130, threw out a rule imposed by concealed carry permit issuing authorities that had required non-residents to have a permit to carry issued by the state in which they resided.  The basis for invalidating such rule was that it denied a New Hampshire non-resident permit to residents of jurisdictions that are effectively No-Issue, such as New Jersey, California, Hawaii, and others.

See also
 Law of New Hampshire

References

New Hampshire law
New Hampshire